The Zhongzhou Park  is a park in Lanxi, Zhejiang, China. It is located on an island in the Lanjiang River.

Features

Access 

This park has floating bridges on both sides of the island. One has a swinging part to allow boats to pass the bridge.

Statue 

There is a statue of Lanhua, a symbol of the city of Lanxi.

References 

Parks in Zhejiang
Jinhua